Robert Burt DeLaughter Sr. (born February 28, 1954 in Vicksburg, Mississippi) is a former state prosecutor and then Hinds County Circuit Judge. He prosecuted and secured the conviction in 1994 of Byron De La Beckwith, charged with the murder of the civil rights leader Medgar Evers on June 12, 1963. Two earlier trials in Mississippi in 1964 had resulted in hung juries.

Career
On March 28, 2008, DeLaughter was suspended from the bench indefinitely by the Mississippi Supreme Court due to allegations of bribery and judicial misconduct. On February 12, 2009, DeLaughter pleaded not guilty to a five-count federal indictment; these charges were linked to the criminal investigation of disgraced tort attorney Richard Scruggs. On July 30, 2009, he pleaded guilty to one obstruction-of-justice charge. On November 13, 2009, DeLaughter was sentenced to 18 months in federal prison by Judge Glen Davidson. In keeping with the recommendation of his plea agreement, Judge Davidson did not impose a financial penalty on DeLaughter due to his negative net worth. He was incarcerated in the federal prison at McCreary and was released on April 13, 2011.

Representation in other media
In 1996, the events surrounding the De La Beckwith trial were memorialized in the Rob Reiner film Ghosts of Mississippi. Alec Baldwin portrayed DeLaughter in the film. In 2001, DeLaughter published his book about the Evers prosecution, entitled Never Too Late: A Prosecutor’s Story of Justice in the Medgar Evers Trial.

References 

1954 births
Living people
American memoirists
Writers from Mississippi
Politicians from Vicksburg, Mississippi
American prosecutors
Mississippi state court judges
Mississippi politicians convicted of crimes